The 1989–90 Kansas State Wildcats men's basketball team represented Kansas State University as a member of the Big 8 Conference during the 1989–90 NCAA Division I men's basketball season. The head coach was Lon Kruger who was in his fourth (and final) season at the helm of his alma mater.  The team played its home games at Bramlage Coliseum in Manhattan, Kansas.  The Wildcats finished with a record of 17–15 (7–7 Big 8), and received an at-large bid to the NCAA tournament as No. 11 seed in the Midwest region. Kansas State lost to Xavier in the opening round of the tournament.

Roster

Schedule and results

|-
!colspan=6 style=| Regular Season

|-
!colspan=6 style=| Big 8 Tournament

|-
!colspan=6 style=| NCAA Tournament

References

Kansas State
Kansas State
Kansas State Wildcats men's basketball seasons
1990 in sports in Kansas
1989 in sports in Kansas